Erucic acid is a monounsaturated omega-9 fatty acid, denoted 22:1ω9. It has the chemical formula CH3(CH2)7CH=CH(CH2)11COOH. It is prevalent in wallflower seed and other plants in the family Brassicaceae, with a reported content of 20 to 54% in high erucic acid rapeseed oil and 42% in mustard oil.  Erucic acid is also known as cis-13-docosenoic acid and the trans isomer is known as brassidic acid.

Uses 
Erucic acid has many of the same uses as mineral oils, but it is more readily biodegradable than some.  It has limited ability to polymerize and dry for use in oil paints. Like other fatty acids, it can be converted into surfactants or lubricants, and can be used as a precursor to biodiesel fuel.

Derivatives of erucic acid have many further uses, such as behenyl alcohol (CH3(CH2)21OH), a pour point depressant (enabling liquids to flow at a lower temperature), and silver behenate, for use in photography.

Sources of erucic acid 

The name erucic means "of or pertaining to Eruca",  which is a genus of flowering plants in the family Brassicaceae. The genus includes colewort (E. sativa), which today is better known as arugula (US) or rocket (UK).

Erucic acid is produced naturally (together with other fatty acids) across a great range of green plants, but especially so in members of the genus Brassica.  For industrial purposes and production of erucic acid, rapeseed is used; for food purposes a 'low-erucic acid rapeseed' (LEAR) has been developed (canola), which contains fats derived from oleic acid instead of erucic acid.

Biochemistry 

Erucic acid is produced by elongation of oleic acid via oleoyl-coenzyme A and malonyl-CoA. Erucic acid is broken down into shorter-chain fatty acids in the human liver by the long-chain acyl CoA dehydrogenase enzyme.

Health effects 
Studies done on laboratory animals in the early 1970s show that erucic acid appears to have toxic effects on the heart at high enough doses. However, more recent research has cast doubt on the relevance of rat studies to the human health of erucic acid. Rats are unusual in their inability to process erucic acid, and the symptoms in rats caused by a diet with high levels of erucic acid have not been observed in pigs, primates, or any other animals. An association between the consumption of rapeseed oil and increased myocardial lipidosis, or heart disease, has not been established for humans.  While there are reports of toxicity from long-term use of Lorenzo's oil (which contains erucic acid and other ingredients), there are no reports of harm to people from dietary consumption of erucic acid.

Publication of animal studies with erucic acid through the 1970s led to governments worldwide moving away from oils with high levels of erucic acid, and tolerance levels for human exposure to erucic acid have been established based on the animal studies.

In 2003, Food Standards Australia set a provisional tolerable daily intake (PTDI) for an average adult of about 500 mg/day of erucic acid, extrapolated based on "the level that is associated with increased myocardial lipidosis in nursing pigs." "There is a 120-fold safety margin between this level and the level that is associated with increased myocardial lipidosis in nursing pigs.  The dietary exposure assessment has concluded that the majority of exposure to erucic acid by the general population would come from the consumption of colza oil.  The dietary intake of erucic acid by an individual consuming at the average level is well below the PTDI; therefore, there is no cause for concern in terms of public health and safety.  However, the individual consuming at a high level has the potential to approach the PTDI.  This would be particularly so if the level of erucic acid in colza oil were to exceed 2% of the total fatty acids."

Food-grade rapeseed oil (also known as canola oil, rapeseed 00 oil, low erucic acid rapeseed oil, LEAR oil, and rapeseed canola-equivalent oil) is regulated to a maximum of 2% erucic acid by weight in the US and 2% in the EU (was 5% before 2019-11-19), with special regulations for infant food. Canola was bred from rapeseed cultivars of B. napus and B. rapa by Dr. Baldur Stefansson at the University of Manitoba, Canada in addition to being cultivated by ancient Chinese, Indian, and Japanese cultures. Canola oil is derived from a variety of rapeseed that is low in erucic acid, as opposed to colza oil.

References

External links
 Erucic acid MS Spectrum

Fatty acids
Alkenoic acids